Playing Soldiers is a 1967 Yugoslav film directed by Bahrudin Čengić. It was listed to compete at the 1968 Cannes Film Festival, but the festival was cancelled due to the events of May 1968 in France.

Cast
 Stole Aranđelović
 Marika Tucanovska
 Zaim Muzaferija
 Zlatko Madunić
 Mija Aleksić
 Zdravko Andrijašević
 Sead Čakal
 Darko Cerar
 Mirsad Ibišević
 Gordan Kulić
 Živko Odak
 Duško Savić
 Milorad Vođević

References

External links

1967 films
1967 drama films
1960s war drama films
Yugoslav war drama films
Serbo-Croatian-language films
Yugoslav black-and-white films
Films about orphans
Films set in Yugoslavia
Films directed by Bato Čengić